David Wong may refer to:

 David T. Wong (born ), Chinese-American scientist whose work contributed to the invention of fluoxetine (Prozac)
 David Shou-Yeh Wong (born ), Hong Kong billionaire, finance tycoon and philanthropist
 David Wong Dak Wah (born 1953), Chief Judge of the High Court of Sabah and Sarawak
 David B. Wong, American philosophy professor at Duke University
 Jason Pargin (born 1975), American humor writer and editor at Cracked.com, who wrote under the pseudonym "David Wong" until 2020
 , (born 1982), American jazz bassist

See also 
 Dave Wang (born 1962), Taiwanese singer
 David Wong Louie (born 1954), American writer of novels and short stories
 David Wang (disambiguation)